Derrick Alexander may refer to:
 Derrick Alexander (wide receiver) (born 1971)
 Derrick Alexander (defensive end) (born 1973)